The following is a list of games taken from the Super Trio series.

Games

Super Trio